Pyay Ti Oo (born 30 November 1978) is a four-time Myanmar Motion Picture Academy Awards winning film actor and advertising model in Myanmar. He is CEO of Pyay Ti Oo Education Foundation, which provides scholarships to economically disadvantaged students who have been accepted into medical school.

Early life
Pyay Ti Oo was born on 30 November 1978 in Yangon to Ti Ti and her physician husband, Dr. Tin Maung Oo. The middle child of three siblings, he has one elder sister, Swe Ti Oo, and one younger sister, Ngwe Ti Oo. His family moved to Mokpalin after his birth. He graduated from Mandalay Technological University with a B.E. degree in Civil Engineering.

Career
Pyay Ti Oo started acting since he was a student. He got his first break in 1999 when he appeared in the program of "Myanmar Language" on Myanmar Radio and Television. His first film was Yan Kyway in which he appeared as a supporting actor. His most successful movies produced in 2009 were Chit-Pan Wah Wah, Cho Lein (Artificial Treat), Yin-Bat Chin A-Nyi, Kyama Pakhon Hma Leikpya Lay Dwe Na Khe Bu De. Pyay Ti Oo acted in six films and many TV advertisements in 2009. Pyay Ti Oo won the 2010 Best Lead Actor Award of Myanmar Academy Award Ceremony on 7 February 2012. He won the Academy Award for his performance in the film Adam, Eve and Datsa. His role "Min Htin Si" in that movie is kind of villain.

Personal life
Pyay Ti Oo has said that if he were not involved in the entertainment industry, he would have become an engineer. Pyay Ti Oo married actress Eaindra Kyaw Zin in January 2011. Their wedding ceremony was broadcast "live" on Burmese TV, MRTV-4. The couple gave birth to their very first born daughter, Pyay Thudra on 14 October 2011.

Social works and political activities
Pyay Ti Oo founded the "Pyay Ti Oo Education Foundation" with a seed investment of ($10000) 10 million kyats. Outstanding students, who qualify to study at medical universities but cannot afford the tuition, are eligible to apply for a grant from his foundation. Each student will receive K50,000 a month for the duration of their studies but must adhere to certain rules and regulations. Students who take up the scholarship are required to stay and work in Myanmar for five years after completing their degrees. They are also not permitted to leave the country or get married while they are studying. Poor grades and attendance records are also grounds for termination of support. For fund-raising, Pyay Ti Oo and his fellow artists made Pyay Ti Oo Foundation Fun-Raising Concert on 4 December 2011 at Thuwunna Indoor Stadium, Yangon. They produced two videos of that and donate all their artist fees.

Following the 2021 Myanmar coup d'état, Pyay Ti Oo participated in the anti-coup movement by attending anti-government rallies and denouncing the coup through social media, starting in February. He joined the "We Want Justice" three-finger salute movement. The movement was launched on social media, and many celebrities joined the movement.

On 17 February 2021, authorities issued an arrest warrant for Pyay Ti Oo, along with those for several other celebrities, for encouraging civil servants to join ongoing civil disobedience movement. 

On 9 April 2021, Pyay Ti Oo and his wife Eaindra Kyaw Zin surrendered to the police. They were released on March 2, 2022.

Filmography

Films (Big Screen Movies)

Awards and nominations

References

External links

                        

1978 births
Living people
Burmese male film actors
People from Yangon
Burmese male models
Burmese philanthropists
21st-century Burmese male actors
Prisoners and detainees of Myanmar